In geometry, a rhombicuboctahedral prism is a convex uniform polychoron (four-dimensional polytope).

It is one of 18 convex uniform polyhedral prisms created by using uniform prisms to connect pairs of Platonic solids or Archimedean solids in parallel hyperplanes.

Images

Alternative names 
 small rhombicuboctahedral prism
 (Small) rhombicuboctahedral dyadic prism (Norman W. Johnson) 
 Sircope (Jonathan Bowers: for small-rhombicuboctahedral prism) 
 (small) rhombicuboctahedral hyperprism

Related polytopes

Runcic snub cubic hosochoron 

A related polychoron is the runcic snub cubic hosochoron, also known as a parabidiminished rectified tesseract, truncated tetrahedral alterprism, or truncated tetrahedral cupoliprism, s3{2,4,3}, . It is made from 2 truncated tetrahedra, 6 tetrahedra, and 8 triangular cupolae in the gaps, for a total of 16 cells, 52 faces, 60 edges, and 24 vertices. It is vertex-transitive, and equilateral, but not uniform, due to the cupolae. It has symmetry [2+,4,3], order 48.

It is related to the 16-cell in its s{2,4,3},  construction. 

It can also be seen as a prismatic polytope with two parallel truncated tetrahedra in dual positions, as seen in the compound of two truncated tetrahedra. Triangular cupolae connect the triangular and hexagonal faces, and the tetrahedral connect edge-wise between.

References

External links 
 
 

4-polytopes